Aloesi Nakoci (born 18 August 1991) is a Fijian rugby sevens player. She competed in the women's tournament at the 2020 Summer Olympics. She won a bronze medal at the event.

Nakoci was part of the Fijiana sevens team at the Rugby World Cup Sevens in Cape Town. In September she played in a warm up match against Canada. She was also named in the Fijiana squad for the 2021 Rugby World Cup.

References

External links

1991 births
Living people
Female rugby sevens players
Olympic rugby sevens players of Fiji
Rugby sevens players at the 2020 Summer Olympics
Medalists at the 2020 Summer Olympics
Olympic bronze medalists for Fiji
Olympic medalists in rugby sevens
Place of birth missing (living people)
Fiji international women's rugby sevens players